The Church–Lafayette Streets Historic District encompasses a well-preserved collection of late 18th- and early 19th-century houses in Wakefield, Massachusetts.  It includes properties on Church Street between Common Street and North Avenue, and on Lafayette Street between Common and Church Streets.  The district was added to the National Register of Historic Places in 1989.

Layout and design 

Church Street, which is immediately south of Lake Quannapowitt, was laid out in the late 17th century, but only had a single house from that period survive, the c. 1681 Hartshorne House at 41 Church Street.  The Hartshorne House was remodeled in the Federal period of the late 18th/early 19th century, when many of the houses on Church Street were built.  The houses at 40, 42, and 44 Church Street were originally built to the same basic plan (three bays wide and four deep), although #42 was later widened to the more typical five bay appearance.  38 Church Street is distinctive in Wakefield for having brick side walls.

Lafayette Street was laid out in 1824, and most of its houses are Greek Revival in character.  The house at 34 Lafayette Street (c. 1835) has a high-style porch with fluted columns, and an elaborate Greek Revival entry with sidelights and fully surrounding architrave.  28 Lafayette (c. 1834) also has a doorway with sidelights, but it is flanked by pilasters.  Across the street stands 23 Lafayette (c. 1834), which stands with its gable end to the street, unlike the other two, where the gable has a pedimental appearance made to look like stone.

See also
Common District (Wakefield, Massachusetts), adjacent to the east
Yale Avenue Historic District, adjacent to the south
National Register of Historic Places listings in Wakefield, Massachusetts
National Register of Historic Places listings in Middlesex County, Massachusetts

References

Historic districts in Middlesex County, Massachusetts
Wakefield, Massachusetts
National Register of Historic Places in Wakefield, Massachusetts
Historic districts on the National Register of Historic Places in Massachusetts